Marc Fielmann (born 24 July 1989) is a German businessman, who is the CEO of Fielmann AG, a company founded by his father.

Early life and education 
Fielmann was born in 1989 in Hamburg, the first of two children and the only son of Heike Fielmann and entrepreneur Günther Fielmann.

Fielmann attended Schule Schloss Salem and London School of Economics and Political Science.

Business career 
Before entering the family business in 2012, Fielmann worked in the eyewear industry for Luxottica and Safilo Group.

Since April 2018, he is CEO of Fielmann AG with responsibility for marketing, communications and executive leadership. Since February 2019, he is also responsible for corporate strategy.

In 2019 Fielmann, aged 29, was the youngest CEO among listed companies in Germany, some claim he is even the youngest CEO among major listed companies worldwide.

Under his leadership, Fielmann AG has announced plans to dedicate more than Euro 200 million to the international expansion and digitization of the group, investing in national market leaders such as Optika Clarus and Óptica Universitaria as well as technology companies such as the augmented reality application provider FittingBox and the smart glasses developer Ubimax.

References 

Alumni of the London School of Economics
German chief executives
Businesspeople from Hamburg
1989 births
Living people
Alumni of Schule Schloss Salem